Anthony Llewellyn "Dassie" Biggs (born 26 April 1946) is a South African former cricketer. He was an opening batsman and off-spin bowler who played first-class cricket for Eastern Province from 1964 to 1980.

References

External links

1946 births
Living people
People from Graaff-Reinet
South African cricketers
Eastern Province cricketers
South African Universities cricketers
Cricketers from the Eastern Cape